Philipp Hoffmann (born 19 June 1992) is a German professional footballer who plays as a midfielder for FC 08 Homburg.

Career
Hoffmann came through 1. FC Saarbrücken's youth system, and made his debut for the club in a 4–2 3. Liga defeat to Arminia Bielefeld in March 2012, as a substitute for Moustapha Salifou. He made no appearances during the 2012–13 season, but became a first-team regular the following year, his performances being one of the few positives in a poor season which saw Saarbrücken relegated to the Regionalliga West. Hoffmann would stay in the 3. Liga, though, signing for SC Preußen Münster at the end of the season. He was signed to FC 08 Homburg on August 14, 2020.

External links
 
 

1992 births
Living people
Association football midfielders
German footballers
1. FC Saarbrücken players
SC Preußen Münster players
FC 08 Homburg players
3. Liga players